Marek Rafał Batkiewicz (born 14 August 1969), is a Polish former ice hockey player. He played for several teams during his career, most notably with Podhale Nowy Targ. He also played for the Polish national team at the 1992 Winter Olympics and several World Championships.

References

External links
 

1969 births
Living people
GKS Katowice (ice hockey) players
Ice hockey players at the 1992 Winter Olympics
MKS Cracovia (ice hockey) players
KTH Krynica players
Olympic ice hockey players of Poland
People from Nowy Targ
Sportspeople from Lesser Poland Voivodeship
Podhale Nowy Targ players
Polish ice hockey goaltenders
20th-century Polish people
21st-century Polish people